İhsan Ketin Natural History Museum is a museum within the Mining Engineering Faculty of Istanbul Technical University. The museum was named after Turkish geologist İhsan Ketin (1914-1995)
The exhibited collections are 
Darwin 2000 Beagle series
İstanbul invertebrate fossils
Zonguldak fossil flora
Solnhofen fossil fauna
 Aegean Region plants and fishes

References

External links
Exhibited items

Istanbul Technical University
Museums in Istanbul
Natural history museums in Turkey